Football Club Libourne, formerly known as AS Libourne or Libourne Saint-Seurin-sur-L'Isle, is a French football team from the town of Libourne in Nouvelle-Aquitaine. The club plays in the Championnat National 3, the fifth tier of French football.

History
The club was founded by Georges Kany in 1935 as Football Club Libourne. The club then became omnisports in 1966 and thus changed its name to Association Sportive Libournaise or simply AS Libourne. However, in October 2009, this merger was undone: AS Libourne returned to its old name of Football Club Libourne and AS Saint-Seurin disappeared.

The club, nicknamed the penguins, were promoted to Ligue 2 from Championnat National after the 2005–06 season, but relegation followed after finishing 19th in 2007–2008. The downfall continued as far as the seventh tier, which the club were champions of in 2013, earning promotion to the DH Ligue d'Aquitaine for the 2013–14 season.

Since then, the club has twice won promotion to the Championnat National 3, in 2017 and 2020.

Name changes
Football Club Libourne (1935–1966)
Association Sportive Libournaise or AS Libourne (1966–1998)
Football Club de Libourne Saint-Seurin-sur-L'Isle (1998–2009)
Football Club Libourne (since 2009)

Former coaches

 Stéphane Ziani

 Jean-Marc Furlan

Former players of note
Mathieu Valbuena

References

 
Association football clubs established in 1998
1998 establishments in France
Sport in Gironde
Football clubs in Nouvelle-Aquitaine